Ramacca  is a comune (municipality) in a mountainous area in the Metropolitan City of Catania in the Italian region of Sicily, located about  southeast of Palermo and about  southwest of Catania. It lies west of the Plain of Catania.  
Ramacca borders the following municipalities: Agira, Aidone, Assoro, Belpasso, Castel di Judica, Lentini, Mineo, Palagonia, Paternò, Raddusa.

Its name derives from the Arabic Rahal Mohac which means Hamlet of Mohac.

Ramacca is home to the   Sagra del Carciofo, which is an artichoke festival held every April. The economy of Ramacca is largely based on the cultivation of artichokes.

References

Cities and towns in Sicily